Kinderhaus is a district of Münster, a city in North Rhine-Westphalia, Germany. It lies approximately 4 km to the north of the centre of Münster and belongs to the borough Münster-Nord, together with Coerde and Sprakel. It has 16,000 inhabitants and is mainly a residential area, though it has attracted some service enterprises, primarily in a large strip mall surrounding the Bürgerzentrum.

History
Kinderhaus was founded in 1333, at that time far outside the city walls of Münster. The name is derived from a 
house for lepers with the name "kinderen hus". Until the start of the 19th century, Kinderhaus consisted only of this house, a church and a few farms.

In the year 1903 Kinderhaus became a part of Münster, and since then it has been steadily growing.

During the Cold War period, Kinderhaus was home to a very large number of USA and British Armed Forces Personnel and their families, probably the biggest enclave in Münster at the time.

Sights
 Wasserschloss Wilkinghege built in 1311, now used as hotel and restaurant
 The leprosy museum of Münster
 The Waldschule (forest school) built in 1673, probably the oldest schoolbuilding in Germany that is still in use

External links
 Homepage of the leprosy museum

Münster
States and territories established in 1333